TCU has more than 90,000 living alumni.  The following lists alphabetically the most prominent graduates of Texas Christian University.

Business, political, and community leaders

Brian Alvey – co-founder of Weblogs, Inc.; serial entrepreneur
 Beverley Bass (BA '74) – former American Airlines pilot; first female American Airlines captain and captain of the first all-female commercial jet airliner crew
 Kyle Bass – Principal and founder of Hayman Capital Management
 Dan Boren – former U.S Representative from Oklahoma's 2nd congressional district
Horace S. Carswell, Jr. – recipient of the Congressional Medal of Honor
 James Cash, Jr. – former Chairman of Harvard MBA program; Senior Associate Dean and Chairman of HBS Publishing; on boards of GE and Microsoft
 Tim Curry – district attorney for Tarrant County from 1972 until his death in 2009
 Israel "Bo" Curtis – Louisiana politician, did graduate studies at TCU
 John Davis – billionaire entrepreneur; 1-800-Flowers founder
 Wendy Davis – 2014 candidate for Texas Governor and former state senator in the Texas Senate
 Gordon R. England (MBA '75) – 71st & 73rd Secretary of the Navy; Deputy Secretary of Defense (2005–2009)
 Hou Chong-wen – Deputy Mayor of Chiayi City, Taiwan
 Eddie Bernice Johnson (B.S. 1967) – U.S. Representative, Texas 30th congressional district
 Kyle Kacal (Certificate in Ranch Management) – member of the Texas House of Representatives from College Station since 2013
 Lois Kolkhorst (Class of 1988) – member of the Texas Senate since 2014 and former member of the Texas House of Representatives
 Mike Lang – member of Texas House of Representatives since 2017
 Robert J. McCann – CEO of UBS Group Americas (2011–present)
 Tommy Merritt – former member of Texas House of Representatives and candidate for Texas Department of Agriculture
 Jim Ranchino – political scientist, political consultant, and pollster in Arkansas
 Winthrop Paul Rockefeller – former Lieutenant Governor of Arkansas from 1996 to 2006
 Bob Schieffer – journalist with CBS News since 1969 and host of Face the Nation
 John Roger Williams – U.S. Representative and former Secretary of State of Texas
 S. Maurice Hicks Jr. - Chief Judge United States District Court Western District of Louisiana
Zuberi Williams - Associate Judge, Maryland District Court (2015 - present)

Arts and entertainment

 Norman Alden – actor with a fifty-year career in movies and television, mostly in voice roles and small parts 
 Scott Brooks – former NBA point guard and current Oklahoma City Thunder head coach; won Coach of the Year Award 2010
 Cecil Brower – Western swing pioneer
 Sandra Brown – bestselling fiction author
 Betty Buckley – vocalist, Broadway and  TV actress (Eight Is Enough)
 Corby Davidson – radio personality in Dallas, Texas (did not graduate)
 Cynthia Dobrinski - handbell composer and clinician
 Frederic Forrest – actor
 John Gilliland – radio broadcaster who created the Pop Chronicles music documentary
 Glenda Green – artist; author of Love Without End, Jesus Speaks (1998)
 Skip Hollandsworth – journalist; screenwriter; Executive Editor of Texas Monthly magazine
 Kristin Holt – television personality; former Dallas Cowboys cheerleader; finalist on the original American Idol
 Clyde Hurley – jazz trumpeter soloist in "In the Mood" by Glenn Miller Band
 Daniel Hunter - known for his music project, Analog Rebellion (formerly PlayRadioPlay!)
 Dan Jenkins – bestselling author and Sports Illustrated writer
 Benton Jennings – actor with a career in theatre, movies, television, and commercials.
 James Kerwin – film and theater director
 Sue Monk Kidd – bestselling author of The Secret Life of Bees
 Chris Klein – film actor, American Pie, We Were Soldiers Once, And Young, Rollerball
 John Knowles – guitarist
 William Lewis – opera singer
 Wendy Powell – voice actress
 Tudi Roche – actress
 Rod Roddy – former The Price Is Right announcer
 Travis Schuldt – television actor on Passions, 10-8: Officers on Duty and Scrubs
 Bud Shrake – sportswriter and author
 Sarah Rose Summers – Miss USA 2018
 Rob Thomas – writer, Veronica Mars and Rats Saw God
 Nina Vance – founder, Alley Theatre in Houston, Texas
 Stephanie Vander Werf – model, TV presenter and beauty pageant contestant; Miss Panama 2012; represented Panama at the Miss Universe 2012
 Shantel VanSanten – actress, One Tree Hill, Final Destination 4, You and I
 Travis Willingham – voice actor

Athletes and coaches

 Scott Ankrom – former Dallas Cowboys wide receiver
 Jake Arrieta – MLB pitcher Baltimore Orioles (2010–13), Chicago Cubs (2013–2017), Philadelphea Phillies (2018-2020)
 Pat Batteaux – former NFL player
 Sammy Baugh – 1935 Heisman Trophy finalist; member of the Pro Football Hall of Fame
 Larry Brown – former cornerback for the Dallas Cowboys and Oakland Raiders, and Super Bowl XXX MVP 
 David Caldwell – former nose tackle for the Green Bay Packers 
 Tank Carder – 2011 Rose Bowl defensive MVP; linebacker for the Cleveland Browns 
 Matt Carpenter – MLB All-Star for the St. Louis Cardinals 
 Andrew Cashner – pitcher for the Miami Marlins
 Bill Collins – Masters Athletics world record holder 
Roosevelt Collins – former NFL player
Norm Cox – former professional football player
Edgar Crespo – Olympic swimmer from Panama
Andy Dalton (class of 2010)  – 2011 Rose Bowl offensive MVP ; Pro Bowl quarterback for the Cincinnati Bengals
 Kenneth E. Davis – 1984 Heisman Trophy finalist; All-American running back 
 Jamie Dixon – current head men's basketball coach at Texas Christian University
 Taylor Featherston – infielder for the Philadelphia Phillies
 Brandon Finnegan – pitcher for the Cincinnati Reds, formerly of the Kansas City Royals; became the first player to play in a College World Series and an MLB World Series in the same year
 Keith Flowers – former NFL player
 Bobby Jack Floyd – former fullback for the Green Bay Packers and Chicago Bears 
 Larry Foyt – semi-retired NASCAR and IRL driver 
Phil Handler – former NFL football player and coach 
 Tom Hoge - PGA golfer
 J. J. Henry – PGA golfer, member of the 2006 Ryder Cup team 
 Bryan Holaday – catcher for the Boston Red Sox 
 Sandora Irvin – former WNBA player, San Antonio Silver Stars 
 Jeremy Kerley – wide receiver for the San Francisco 49ers
 Harry Kinzy – former MLB pitcher
 Max Knake – former Arena Football League quarterback
 Jenny Lidback – former LPGA golfer 
 Bob Lilly – former Dallas Cowboys defensive tackle; member of the Pro Football Hall of Fame
 George McLeod – former NBA player 
 Guy Morriss – former NFL Pro Bowl center; former head football coach at Baylor University and University of Kentucky 
 Lee Nailon – former NBA player 
 Jeff Newman – former MLB All Star player for the Boston Red Sox and Oakland Athletics 
 Davey O'Brien – 1938 Heisman Trophy winner; won the Walter Camp and Maxwell Award the same year 
 David Pate – 1991 Australian Open Men's Doubles Champion; runner-up of the 1991 US Open in Men's Doubles
 Matt Purke – pitcher for the Chicago White Sox
 Mike Renfro – former NFL receiver for the Houston Oilers and the Dallas Cowboys 
 Khadevis Robinson – USA Olympian in the 800 meter run; multiple USATF gold medalist; world record-breaker, running the fastest leg in the 4x800 in 2006 
 Aaron Schobel – retired Pro Bowl defensive end with the NFL's Buffalo Bills 
 Bo Schobel – former defensive end with the NFL's Arizona Cardinals 
 Matt Schobel – former tight end with the NFL's Philadelphia Eagles 
 Angela Stanford – professional golfer on the LPGA Tour 
Jim Swink – All-American running back; member of the College Football Hall of Fame; runner-up for the 1955 Heisman Trophy 
 Kurt Thomas – former NBA player
 LaDainian Tomlinson – 2006 NFL MVP and 2000 Heisman Trophy finalist; San Diego Chargers 2001–09; New York Jets 2010–2011 
 Gregg Troy – head coach of the University of Florida swimming and diving team 
 Kris Tschetter – former professional golfer on the LPGA Tour 
 Jason Tucker – former wide receiver for the Canadian Football League's Edmonton Eskimos; four-time All Star; 91st Grey Cup MVP 
 Johnny Vaught – 1932 All-American guard for TCU; former Head Coach of the University of Mississippi; member of the College Football Hall of Fame
 Will Walls – former NFL football player
 Jeff Zimmerman – former All-Star pitcher for the Texas Rangers

Other

 Carson Huey-You – youngest graduate in TCU history, Graduated with a Bachelor’s Degree in physics at age 14.

Fictional alumni
 The Professor (Roy Hinkley) – character from the 1960s TV series Gilligan's Island has, among his six degrees, a PhD from TCU
 Reverend Timothy Lovejoy – animated character from The Simpsons

References

Texas Christian University alumni